Route 9, Hong Kong is one of the strategic trunk roads, mostly in the form of a motorway, circumnavigating the New Territories. The route is also known as the New Territories Circular Road (新界環迴公路). Starting from the Shing Mun Tunnels, Route 9 links (moving in an anti-clockwise direction) Sha Tin, Tai Po, Fanling, Sheung Shui, Yuen Long, Tuen Mun and Tsuen Wan. The section between Exit 10 in Kwu Tung and Exit 16 in Lam Tei is part of  Asian Highway 1, although the Asian Highway Network is not signed in Hong Kong.

History
Route 9 was established after a shake-up of the route number system in January 2004, replacing the old system which had been used since 1974.

Route description
Like other strategic routes in Hong Kong, Route 9 consists of several sections.

The section from Tsuen Wan to Sha Tin is derived from the former Route 5, which includes the Shing Mun Tunnels and most of the Tai Po Road - Sha Tin Section. This section was opened in 1990.

Route 9 then runs in a northerly direction via the remaining portion of Tai Po Road - Sha Tin until the Racecourse Interchange, where it continues via the 12.3 km-long Tolo Highway (opened in 1985) to Lam Kam Road Interchange, to the north of Tai Po. The widening of Tolo Highway between Ma Liu Shui and Tai Po to a dual 3-lane motorway was completed in 2003. It is built to full British motorway standards (3/4 lanes and a hard shoulder). The Tolo Highway continues as another dual 3-lane expressway, Fanling Highway, which was completed in three stages between 1985 and 1987, running due north and north-west, connecting Tai Po North and Pak Shek Au, near San Tin.

At San Tin Interchange near Lok Ma Chau, Route 9 turns south towards Au Tau, near Yuen Long onto an expressway known as the San Tin Highway. After interchanging with Route 3, Route 9 runs along the Yuen Long Highway to Lam Tei Interchange, followed by Tuen Mun Road, all the way to Tsuen Wan.

At Tsuen Wan, the section of Route 9 linking Chai Wan Kok and Shek Wai Kok was opened on 8 February 2007. Traffic then continues its way back to the Shing Mun Tunnels via the new road and the existing Cheung Pei Shan Road.

Exits and interchanges
{| class="plainrowheaders wikitable"
|-
|colspan=6 style="text-align:center;color:#FFF;font-size:120%;" bgcolor="#CF0421"| Route 9
|-
!scope=col|District
!scope=col|Location
!scope=col|km
!scope=col|Exit
!scope=col|Destinations
!scope=col|Notes
|-

|-
|Kwai Tsing
|Shek Wai Kok
|style="text-align:right"|0.0
|style="text-align:center"|
| (Cheung Pei Shan Road) - Tsuen Wan, Kwai Chung
|Clockwise-direction terminus
|-

|-
|rowspan=4|Sha Tin
|Shing Mun
|style="text-align:right"|0.4–3.1
|colspan=3 bgcolor="#dcdcfe" style="text-align:center"| Shing Mun Tunnels
|-
|Tai Wai
|style="text-align:right"|4.3
|style="text-align:center" rowspan=3|1
|Tai Po Road — Tai Wai - Tai Wai
|Clockwise exit and anticlockwise entrance only
|-
|rowspan=2|Sha Tin
|style="text-align:right"|5.5
| (Tsing Sha Highway) - Kowloon West
|Anticlockwise exit and clockwise entrance only
|-
|style="text-align:right"|5.6
|bgcolor="#d3d3d3"|Tai Po Road — Tai Wai - Tai Wai
|bgcolor="#d3d3d3"|Exit permanently closed on 8 June 2014. From 2012, was only accessible through clockwise entrance of exit 2. Clockwise exit only
|-

|-
|rowspan=2|Sha Tin
|Sha Tin
|style="text-align:right"|6.1
|style="text-align:center"|2
|Sha Tin Rural Committee Road - Sha Tin Town Centre
|
|-
|Fo Tan
|style="text-align:right"|6.9
|style="text-align:center"|2A
|Fo Tan Road / Lok King Street - Fo Tan
|Anticlockwise exit and clockwise entrance only
|-

|-
|rowspan=4|Sha Tin
|rowspan=4|Fo Tan
|style="text-align:right"|7.6
|style="text-align:center"|2B
| ( Sha Tin Road) - Sha Tin Wai, Kowloon Central
|Anticlockwise exit and clockwise entrance only
|-
|style="text-align:right"|8.2
|bgcolor="#ffdddd" style="text-align:center"|2C
|bgcolor="#ffdddd"|Yuen Wo Road - Penfold Park
|bgcolor="#ffdddd"|Clockwise exit and entrance only
|-
|style="text-align:right"|8.5
|bgcolor="#dff9f9" style="text-align:center"|2D
|bgcolor="#dff9f9"|Tai Po Road — Sha Tin - Chinese University, Kau To Shan, Tai Po Kau
|bgcolor="#dff9f9"|Anticlockwise exit and clockwise entrance only. Entrance from Tai Po Road — Ma Liu Shui
|-
|style="text-align:right"|8.9
|style="text-align:center"|3
|Sha Tin Racecourse
|Anticlockwise exit and clockwise entrance from and to  Tolo Highway
|-

|-
|rowspan=2|Sha Tin
|rowspan=2|Ma Liu Shui
|style="text-align:right"|10.1
|style="text-align:center"|3A
| ( Tate's Cairn Highway) - Ma On Shan, Sha Tin Wai, Kowloon East
|Clockwise exit and anticlockwise entrance only
|-
|style="text-align:right"|10.1
|style="text-align:center"|4
|Chak Cheung Street / Science Park Road - Ma Liu Shui, Ma On Shan; Pak Shek Kok
|Clockwise entrance from Sui Cheung Road
|-
|rowspan=4|Tai Po
|Pak Shek Kok
|style="text-align:right"|13.4
|bgcolor="#ffdddd" style="text-align:center"|4A
|bgcolor="#ffdddd"|Chong San Road - Pak Shek Kok, Science Park
|bgcolor="#ffdddd"|No anticlockwise exit
|-
|rowspan=2|Tai Po
|style="text-align:right"|16.0
|style="text-align:center"|5
|Tai Po Road — Yuen Chau Tsai / Yuen Shin Road / Tai Po Tai Wo Road - Tai Po South, Tai Po Industrial Estate, Tai Po Market
|
|-
|style="text-align:right"|17.0
|style="text-align:center"|5A
|Tat Wan Road - Tai Po South
|Anticlockwise exit and clockwise entrance only
|-
|Tai Wo
|style="text-align:right"|19.5
|style="text-align:center"|6
|Tai Po Tai Wo Road - Tai Po North, Tai Wo
|
|-

|-
|rowspan=2|Tai Po
|Lam Tsuen
|style="text-align:right"|20.8
|style="text-align:center"|7
|  / Tai Po Road — Tai Wo / Tai Wo Service Road West / Hong Lok Yuen Road - Shek Kong, Tai Po North, Hong Lok Yuen
|
|-
|Kau Lung Hang
|style="text-align:right"|23.5
|bgcolor="#ffdddd" style="text-align:center"|7A
|bgcolor="#ffdddd"|Tai Wo Service Road East - 
|bgcolor="#ffdddd"|Clockwise exit and entrance only
|-
|rowspan=5|North
|rowspan=2|Fanling
|style="text-align:right"|23.9
|style="text-align:center"|7B
|Pak Wo Road - Wo Hop Shek
|Anticlockwise exit and clockwise entrance only. Entrance from Jockey Club Road
|-
|style="text-align:right"|24.1
|style="text-align:center"|7C
|Pak Wo Road - Fanling, Sha Tau Kok
|Anticlockwise exit and clockwise entrance only. Entrance from Jockey Club Road
|-
|rowspan=2|Sheung Shui
|style="text-align:right"|26.1
|style="text-align:center"|8
|So Kwun Po Road - Fanling, Sheung Shui
|
|-
|style="text-align:right"|26.9
|style="text-align:center"|9
| / Po Shek Wu Road - Sheung Shui, Kwu Tung, Shek Kong, Man Kam To
|
|-
|Kwu Tung
|style="text-align:right"|29.9
|style="text-align:center"|9A
|Castle Peak Road — Chau Tau / Kwu Tung Road - Kwu Tung, Chau Tau
|Anticlockwise exit and clockwise exit only
|-

|-
|rowspan=3|Yuen Long
|Kwu Tung
|style="text-align:right"|31.3
|bgcolor="#ddffdd" style="text-align:center"|10
|bgcolor="#ddffdd"|San Sham Road ( AH1) / Castle Peak Road — San Tin / Castle Peak Road — Chau Tau / Kwu Tung Road - Shenzhen, Lok Ma Chau, San Tin, Kwu Tung
|bgcolor="#ddffdd"|Eastern concurrency terminus of  AH1. This exit has two additional exit ramps; see San Tin Highway for more information. Anticlockwise exits and clockwise entrance from and to  Fanling Highway
|-
|Mai Po
|style="text-align:right"|33.3
|style="text-align:center"|10A
|Mai Po Lung Road / Shek Wu Wai Road - Mai Po, San Tin
|Clockwise exit and anticlockwise entrance only
|-
|Ngau Tam Mei
|style="text-align:right"|36.2
|style="text-align:center"|11
|Fairview Park Boulevard / Castle Peak Road — Tam Mi / San Tam Road - Fairview Park, San Tin, Ngau Tam Mei, Kam Tin
|
|-

|-
|rowspan=6|Yuen Long
|Au Tau
|style="text-align:right"|38.8
|style="text-align:center"|12
| ( Tsing Long Highway) - Tsuen Wan, Tsing Yi, Kowloon, Lantau
|
|-
|rowspan=3|Shap Pat Heung
|style="text-align:right"|39.7
|rowspan=2 style="text-align:center"|13
|Castle Peak Road — Yuen Long - Tai Tong, Yuen Long
|Anticlockwise exit and clockwise entrance only. Connected to the other half of exit 13
|-
|style="text-align:right"|41.3
|Shap Pat Heung Road - Tai Tong, Yuen Long, Kam Tin
|Clockwise exit and anticlockwise entrance only. Connected to the other half of exit 13
|-
|style="text-align:right"|40.3
|style="text-align:center"|13A
|Shap Pat Heung Interchange - Yuen Long South, Tai Tong
|Anticlockwise exit only. Connected to the other half of exit 13
|-
|rowspan=2|Hung Shui Kiu
|style="text-align:right"|43.1
|style="text-align:center"|14
|Long Tin Road - Tin Shui Wai East
|
|-
|style="text-align:right"|44.6
|style="text-align:center"|15
|Hung Tin Road - Tin Shui Wai West, Hung Shui Kiu
|
|-
|rowspan=2|Tuen Mun
|rowspan=2|Lam Tei
|style="text-align:right"|46.6
|bgcolor="#ddffdd" style="text-align:center"|16
|bgcolor="#ddffdd"| ( AH1) ( Kong Sham Western Highway) - Ha Tsuen, Shekou
|bgcolor="#ddffdd"|Western concurrency terminus of  AH1
|-
|style="text-align:right"|47.8
|style="text-align:center"|17
|Castle Peak Road — Lam Tei / Castle Peak Road — Lingnan / Tsing Lun Road - Lam Tei, Lingnan University
|Anticlockwise entrance accessible only from connection at exit 16 from exit ramp to entrance ramp
|-

|-
|rowspan=6|Tuen Mun
|rowspan=3|San Hui
|style="text-align:right"|49.1
|style="text-align:center"|18
|Tsing Tin Road - Tai Hing
|
|-
|style="text-align:right"|49.5
|rowspan=2 style="text-align:center"|19
|bgcolor="#ffdddd"|San Tak Street - San Hui
|bgcolor="#ffdddd"|Clockwise exit and entrance only. Entrance from Yuk Hong Street
|-
|style="text-align:right"|49.9
| - Tuen Mun Town Centre
|Anticlockwise exit and clockwise entrance only
|-
|rowspan=3|Tuen Mun Town Centre
|style="text-align:right"|50.2
|bgcolor="#ffdddd" rowspan=2 style="text-align:center"|20
|bgcolor="#ffdddd"|Tuen Fat Road - Tuen Mun Town Centre
|bgcolor="#ffdddd"|Service road parallel to Tuen Hi Road. Anticlockwise exit and entrance only
|-
|style="text-align:right"|50.7
|bgcolor="#ffdddd"|Tuen Hi Road - Tuen Mun Town Centre
|bgcolor="#ffdddd"|Service road parallel to Tuen Fat Road. Clockwise exit and entrance only
|-
|style="text-align:right"|50.9
|style="text-align:center"|20A
|Tuen Hing Road - Tuen Mun Town Centre
|Clockwise exit and anticlockwise entrance only
|-

|-
|rowspan=2|Tuen Mun
|Tuen Mun South
|style="text-align:right"|51.2
|style="text-align:center"|21
|Wong Chu Road - Tuen Mun South
|
|-
|Tai Lam
|style="text-align:right"|56.2
|style="text-align:center"|22
|Castle Peak Road — Tai Lam, Castle Peak Road — New Tai Lam - Tai Lam, So Kwun Wat, Tsing Lung Tau
|
|-
|rowspan=4|Tsuen Wan
|Sham Tseng
|style="text-align:right"|61.7
|style="text-align:center"|23
|Castle Peak Road — Sham Tseng - Sham Tseng
|
|-
|rowspan=2|Ting Kau
|style="text-align:right"|62.6
|rowspan=2 style="text-align:center"|24
| ( Ting Kau Bridge) - Tsing Yi, Kowloon, Lantau
|Anticlockwise exit and clockwise entrance only
|-
|style="text-align:right"|63.9
| ( Tsing Long Highway) - Yuen Long, Lok Ma Chau, Shenzhen 
|Clockwise exit and anticlockwise entrance only
|-
|Chai Wan Kok
|style="text-align:right"|66.7
|style="text-align:center"|24A
| ( Tsuen Wan Road) - Tsuen Wan, Kwai Chung, Kowloon
|Anticlockwise exit and clockwise entrance only
|-

|-
|rowspan=2|Tsuen Wan
|Chai Wan Kok
|style="text-align:right"|67.4
|bgcolor="#ffdddd" style="text-align:center"|24C
|bgcolor="#ffdddd"|Castle Peak Road — Tsuen Wan - Tsuen Wan
|bgcolor="#ffdddd"|No clockwise exit
|-
|Tai Wo Hau
|style="text-align:right"|68.8
|style="text-align:center"|25
|Route Twisk /  /  / Wai Tsuen Road - Tsuen Wan, Tai Wo Hau, Kam Tin
|
|-
|rowspan=2|Kwai Tsing
|rowspan=2|Shek Wai Kok
|style="text-align:right"|70.3
|style="text-align:center"|25A
| / Sam Tung Uk Road / Cheung Shan Estate Road East - Shek Wai Kok, Wo Yi Hop, Shing Mun, Kwai Chung
|
|-
|style="text-align:right"|70.8
|style="text-align:center"|
| (Cheung Pei Shan Road) - Sha Tin, Tai Po
|Anticlockwise-direction terminus

Notes

See also
 Transport in Hong Kong
 Fanling Highway
 San Tin Highway
 Tuen Mun Road
 Yuen Long Highway

References

External links
Hong Kong Strategic Route, Exit Number and Chainage Marker System
 Details of Route 9 - Section between Shek Wai Kok and Chai Wan Kok

AH1
 
Routes in Hong Kong
Ring roads in Hong Kong